Warren Cole may refer to:

Warren Cole (rower) (1940–2019), New Zealand rower
Warren A. Cole (1889–1968), American businessman
Warren Henry Cole (1898–1990), American surgeon